Duncormick railway station was located about 1.5 miles from the village of Duncormick in County Wexford, Ireland.

The station opened on 1 August 1906, and closed on 6 September 1976, with goods traffic having stopped the winter before. Passenger trains continued to run past the site of the station until 18 September 2010 and the line is currently used on occasion for empty stock movements.

Bus Éireann route 381 from Wexford to Blackhall serves Duncormick on Tuesdays-only.

Routes

References

Disused railway stations in County Wexford
Railway stations opened in 1906
Railway stations closed in 1976
1906 establishments in Ireland
Railway stations in the Republic of Ireland opened in the 20th century